Produced at KUT, In Black America is a long-running, nationally syndicated program dedicated to all facets of the African American experience. John L Hanson Jr. profiles a diverse selection of current and historically significant figures whose stories help illuminate life in Black America. Guests include civil rights leaders, educators, artists, athletes and writers describing their experiences, achievements and work in chronicling and advancing the quality of African American life.

In 2019 KUT in collaboration with the American Archive of Public Broadcasting were awarded a Recordings at Risk CLIR grant to digitize, preserve, and provide access to In Black America. Access to the episodes is made available through the American Archive of Public Broadcasting, KUT, and the Briscoe Center for American History.

References

External links 
 
In Black America Special Collection at the American Archive of Public Broadcasting

1970 radio programme debuts
American news radio programs
American Public Media programs
Peabody Award-winning radio programs
Audio podcasts
2013 podcast debuts